Lydia Nicole (born Lydia Fernandez) is an American actress, comedian, writer and producer based out of Los Angeles, California. Her career in the entertainment industry began in 1972 with the Inner City Broadcasting Corporation at New York City R&B station, WBLS-FM. In 1981, she made her debut as an actress guest starring on The Greatest American Hero. Nicole is best known for her role as Rafaela in Stand and Deliver, and her current project, web series Common Sense Mamita.

Early life and education 
Nicole grew up in Spanish Harlem, New York City. From 13 to 18 years old, she worked for radio station WBLS-FM, New York as assistant music director. That experience brought her to California to work for Casablanca Records, a premier disco record company.

Nicole studied theater at Fordham University in New York City before moving to Hollywood. Once in California, she was part of the UCLA Writer's Program and studied with acting coaches Roy London and Stella Adler, as well as Broadway director Jose Quintero.

Current work

Common Sense Mamita 
Common Sense Mamita is a comedic web series written, produced and hosted by Nicole. The show premiered on Latin Heat Entertainment in 2013 and has run weekly every Thursday since.

Career 
Nicole entered show business at the number one R&B radio station in New York City, WBLS-FM. From 1973 to 1978, she worked with radio icons Hal Jackson, Frankie Crocker and Wanda Ramos under Inner City Broadcasting Corporation. At 18, Nicole became ICBC's youngest assistant music director.
In Los Angeles, Nicole worked under record mogul, Jheryl Busby and managed R&B recording artist Patrice Rushen's fan club. In 1981, she resumed her position with ICBC as music director for two California based stations, KGFJ-AM and KUTE-FM. Under Nicole's guidance, KGFJ-AM became the top R&B and Hip Hop station in Los Angeles.

Nicole landed her first role on television in 1981 when she guest starred in The Greatest American Hero. She made appearances in shows such as Hill Street Blues (1981) and The Fall Guy (1981), and movies like Murder in Texas (1981). In a 1983 issue of Ebony Magazine, Nicole was named one of the "New Faces in Hollywood". In 1982, she appeared in a two-part episode of The Jeffersons as gang leader, Rachel, who robs and stabs George Jefferson. She then landed the role as Rafaela costarring with Edward James Olmos in Stand and Deliver. The part allowed Nicole the opportunity to promote the film to high schools across the country.

By 1988, Nicole took up comedy in the Latino standup world. She was one of very few Latinas on the comedy circuit and a regular at the World Famous Comedy Store. She also opened for her former employer, R&B singer Patrice Rushen. In 1993, Nicole was featured on BET's Comic View. In 1991, the lack of racial and gender diversity in stand up prompted Nicole to co-find "Funny Ladies of Color" with comic Cha Cha Sandoval and agent Sharona Fae. The group was composed of women of color including Sherri Shepherd, Jackie Guerra, Dyana Ortelli, Lotus Weinstock and Carlease Burke. She also co-founded "The Hot & Spicy Mamitas", the first all female Latina stand up comedy show, featuring Sully Diaz, Marilyn Martinez, Ludo Vika and Dyana Ortelli. Together, they released a stand up comedy album on Uproar Records. The group was mentioned in Darryl J. Littleton and Tuezdae Littleton's book, Comediennes: Laugh Be a Lady along with female comedians Whoopi Goldberg, Lily Tomlin, Lucille Ball, and Margaret Cho.

Nicole took her standup and created her first one-woman show entitled "Calling Up Papi" at the World Famous Comedy Store in which she performs the roles of 26 characters.

Other ventures 
Nicole co-produced comedy shows "Funny Ladies of Color" and the "Hot & Spicy Mamitas", and also wrote, produced and starred in her second one-woman show, A Rose Grows in Spanish Harlem. Starting in 1985, Nicole began working alongside filmmaker Robert Townsend" on the movie Hollywood Shuffle (1988). She worked with him again in 2002 on film and web series productions. She started as a basic assistant and became associate producer of Code Black Entertainment's Why We Laugh: Black Comedians on Black Comedy, Los Americans, and In the Hive. In 2015, she produced Townsend's film Playin' for Love, a romantic comedy film with Townsend Entertainment.

Philanthropy 
From 1991 to 2002, Nicole took her childhood story Calling up Papi to high schools across the country and youth authorities around Southern California in an effort to promote the importance of education to inner city kids and juvenile offenders.

She spoke for various organizations such as Athletes and Entertainers For Kids, The Ryan White program, Kareem's Kids and Kathy Ireland's Mother's and Daughter's Tea.

References 

Living people
20th-century American actresses
People from East Harlem
21st-century American actresses
American television actresses
American film actresses
Fordham University alumni
American women comedians
Year of birth missing (living people)